AKA Brown was a New Zealand music group.

They achieved success in their native country.

References

New Zealand dance music groups